Embolemus ruddii is a small aculeate wasp in the family Embolemidae.

Biology
Females are apterous whilst males are winged. It is a widespread, yet rarely recorded palearctic species. They are believed to parasitise tree root-feeding planthoppers in the family Cixiidae.

References

Chrysidoidea
Insects described in 1833